Clint Baclawski (born 1981) is a Boston-based artist who works with photography and light, shooting on an analog camera and transforms the prints into light-filled installation pieces.

Biography 
Born in Lewisburg, Pennsylvania, Baclawski attended Rochester Institute of Technology (RIT) for his BFA and Bucknell University for post-baccalaureate study. He then attended Massachusetts College of Art and Design for his MFA.

Style of work 
Baclawski's work are installations "composed of film image fragments stuffed inside polycarbonate tubes, propped onto mirrored Plexiglas and back-lit by LED lights." This style of art "feels both intimate and epic; he wraps you up in a world by breaking it down into slices." The Boston Art Review noted how Baclawski's work connects to his undergraduate degree in advertising photography especially the use of "back-lit imagery" to convey glamour to rural photographs. Baclawski " works with light, imagery, and installation, pushing the boundaries of the traditional photographic frame" (Frame Magazine, 2018).
Cate McQuaid  of the Boston Globe Said of his solo show “Fringe” that "Baclawski models the enchantments and perils of desire. From afar, an object of yearning — a lover, salvation, relief from pain — floods the imagination with its perfections.

Solo exhibitions 
2014  Chromogenic, The Hallway Gallery, Jamaica Plain, MA 

2014 Pink Church, 301 Gallery, Montserrat College of Art, Beverly, MA 

2015  Lush, California Polytechnic State University, San Luis Obispo, CA 

2015  ACTINIC, Alternative Photography Festival of Scotland, Edinburgh, Scotland 

2016  Clint Baclawski: Luminous, Adelson Galleries, Boston, MA

2017  Zephyr, HUBweek Boston, City Hall Plaza, Boston, MA 

2019 Fringe, Abigail Ogilvy, Boston, MA

Publications 
2010 Clint Baclawski : recent work

2018 One artist, one material : fifty-five makers on their medium

References

American photographers
American installation artists
Living people
1981 births